Mariam Tsiklauri (born 18 March 1960) is a Georgian poet, children's author and translator.

Biography 
Mariam Tsiklauri was born in Tbilisi, Georgia. She graduated from Tbilisi State University in 1983 as a chemist. She worked as a teacher as well as editor for various publishing houses. She also works as the curator for the Living library project from the Ministry of Culture.

Mariam Tsiklauri is one of the founders of Children's Literature Development Fund – Libo. She is also the author of Georgian-English anthology Georgian Female Poets, comprising poems of 32 Georgian female authors. Her poems have been translated to Lithuanian, English, German, Swedish, Ukrainian, Italian, Russian, Armenian, Czech, Slovakian and Polish languages.

Works

Books

 I Hear Poems Cooee, 2001, 
 Wing of Mist Shall I Spread, 2006, 
 Lanterner, 2009, 
 White Calf, 2010, 
 Ritual of Evermore, 2012, 
 Standing Pray for the Sun, 2014, 
 One Hundred Poems, 2014, 
 Today's Day (the entreis), 2015, 
 For the Tameness, 2016
 For Believing, Nodar Dumbadze International Fund and Edition, 
 Happy Sovieticus, Nodar Dumbadze International Fund and Edition, 
 Road Crossing, Intelect Publishing,

Children's books

 Brandi-Brundi, 2005, 
 Oh Talisman of the Sun, 2009, 
 Naninebi (With Audio CD), 2009, 
 Street and Streetlights, 2010, 
 Let's Be Friends With Soap Bubbles, 2010, 
 Coloring Poems, 2010, 
 Funny Numbers, 2010, 
 Chichita, 2011, ISSN 1987-7005; 
 There Was A Tale, 2011, 
 Realm of the Alphabet, 2012, 
 Georgian Alphabet, 2013, 
 Funny Recipes, 2016

Translated books
 Verses by Mariam Tsiklauri in the book: I Am Many (Women's Voices From Georgia) Poetry collection of twelve Georgian female authors, translated by Sabine Schiffner, project author Irma Shiolashvili, Pop-Verlag Ludwigsburg Publishing

Translations
 Giorgos Seferis — Turnaround (Nobel Prize Winners series), Tbilisi, Intellect Publishing, 2015,  
 Odysseas Elytis — Seven Days For Iternety (Nobel Prize Winners series), Tbilisi, Intellect Publishing, 2015, 
 Vladas Braziūnas — Opening of the Day, Tbilisi, Nodar Dumbadze Publishing and Literary Agency, 2018, 
 Natalia Trokhym — Weary Sun, Tbilisi, Nodar Dumbadze Publishing and Literary Agency, 2018,

Awards and honors
 Grand-prix of the literature competition Shotaoba, Special prize of Sandra Roelofs for the poem Golden Fish, 2009
 Makvala Mrevlishvili Prize for fertile endeavor in children's literature, 2010
 Children's Book's Second Festival Prize for "The Author of The Year's Best Children's Book" (Coloring Poems, Shemetsneba Publishing), 2010
 Prize from female poet competition Khvarazmoba, 2011, 2015, 2016
 Gala (literary prize) for poem collection White Calf, 2011
 Winner of St. Nino festival, 2011
 Prize and medal of the Georgian Spirit Festival, 2012
 First Prize of literature competition Shotaoba, 2012, 2013
 Iakob Gogebashvili youth and children's literature prize for the nomination of 'Year's best poetic collection', for the book 'Joyful Recipes', 2017
 Nominated for Astrid Lindgren Memorial Award (ALMA) 2019 for work dedicated to children
 Iakob Gogebashvili youth and children's literature prize for the nomination of 'Children and Youth's Innovative Project'. for TV project "Club Do" (In collaboration with Nino Chkhikvadze), 2019

References

Sources
 TSIKLAURI MARIAM
 Poems by Mariam Tsiklauri
 Mariam Tsiklauri' Profile
 ONCE … — MARIAM TSIKLAURI, translated by Manana Matiashvili in the 'Masque & Spectacle' magazine, June 1, 2017, number 12: Transcaucasia Issue
 Read Poetry: (I have searched…), by Mariam Tsiklauri
 MARIAM TSIKLAURI AUTHOR

1960 births
Living people
Poets from Georgia (country)
Writers from Tbilisi
Women poets from Georgia (country)
Tbilisi State University alumni
Translators from Georgia (country)
Postmodern writers